Fadhi gaab is a village in the Gar-adag District of the Sanaag region of Somaliland.

See also
Administrative divisions of Somaliland
Regions of Somaliland
Districts of Somaliland
Somalia–Somaliland border

References 

Populated places in Sanaag